Naebang Station is a station on the Seoul Subway Line 7. To avoid confusion with Bangbae Station on Seoul Subway Line 2, the station was named as "inner (내, 內) of Bangbae-dong (방, 方)."

Station layout

Vicinity
Exit 1 : Seoripul Park
Exit 2 : Bangil Elementary School
Exit 3 :
Exit 4 : Namseoul Market
Exit 5 : Bangbae Elementary School
Exit 6 : Isu Central Market
Exit 7 : Bangbae Post Office
Exit 8 : Bangbae Middle School

Metro stations in Seocho District
Seoul Metropolitan Subway stations
Railway stations opened in 2000